Frederick J. Bacon was a late 19th to mid 20th century performer and recording artist on the five string banjo. He was also an inventor and entrepreneur, educator, composer, and designer and manufacturer of banjos.
At the height of his performance career he played the banjo nationally. Along with Fred Van Eps and Vess Ossman he was part of a group of banjoists labeled "virtuoso" in the newspapers. He founded the F.J Bacon Co., possibly as early as 1902, after having invented a new resonator for open-back banjos.  It wasn’t until 1908 that Bacon came up with Bacon Mfg. & Publishing Co. to sell his banjos and music compositions.  During the Big Five tour Bacon became Bacon Mfg. Co in 1911 from Forestdale and incorporated Bacon Mfg. Co. in 1912 (dissolved in 1915).  In 1918 from New London he called himself Bacon Banjo Mfg. Co. around 1918, and formally the Bacon Banjo Co. Inc in 1920 with E.O Winship and wives.  In 1922 his company gained business experience in David L. Day, formerly of Vega. Together they produced Bacon and Day banjos (B.&D. on the headstock), some of which have been considered worthy of display in museums, as showpieces of artistic impulse from the Jazz Age. Frederick and his wife Cassie were proponents of the classic banjo style of playing banjo, in which the strings are plucked with the fingers, without picks.

Musicianship 
Across his career, Fred J. Bacon played a variety of musical styles on the five-string banjo and snare drum.  His performances included his own compositions such as The Fascinator and The Conqueror march, classical compositions such as Minuette a l'Antique by Paderewski, and arrangements of folk music or minstrel songs, including Massa's in the Cold, Cold Ground. Known mainly as a banjo player, he also continued to bring his drum on stage throughout his career, doing drum solos, and in 1936 advertised as a teacher of banjo, guitar,  drums and violin.

Growing up in Connecticut, he took banjo lessons from Alfred A. Farland when he was 12-years old. Bacon began public performance at 16, in medicine shows, variety shows, and Wild West shows, playing the snare drum and swinging his banjo. His earliest acts included roles with "Hornsby's Oats" (a stage show in Boston) and with Broncho John’s Wild West Show as "Nebraska Fred." A performance poster in Boston labeled him the "Banjo Kid."

Bacon began performing on his own, under his really name and teaching the banjo. He married Cassie Maria Bacon in 1890, and the two would travel the country and eventually perform together. By 1911, Bacon had learned to play in a duo style, "playing two distinct airs at the same time."

In 1918 Bacon was advertised for a concert representing the banjo before the American Guild of Banjoists, Mandolinists and Guitarists, alongside musicians such as concert Mandolinists Samuel Siegel (mandolin) and William Foden (guitar). The trio performed together in concerts between 1904 and 1918.

Besides his banjo, Bacon also continued to play his snare drum in concert as late as 1933. He played two solos, Battle Scene and  Coming and Going of the Empire Express.

Bacon Banjo Company 
Bacon's performances became an opportunity to sell banjos as he gained name recognition across the country. By 1907 he was having banjos made for him by Vega to sell as his own. They were sold as far way as Los Angeles and New Jersey.

While living in Hartford he started the "F. J. Bacon and Company" in 1902, with A. E. Squires and G. S. Masleu, selling musical instrument strings. Bacon banjo strings  and Bacon violin strings, were sold in music stores in 1903. At the time,  he also endorsed Fairbanks banjos in the music store advertisements. In the Cadenza magazine, 1910,  he is picture holding a Fairbanks Whyte Laydie.

Bacon experimented with musical instrument making. While visiting Brandon, Vermont in 1901 he sold his "patent neverslip banjo bridge" to W. H. Johnson of that town. Johnson had been making the bridges for the "Bacon Banjo Bridge Company" and invented machinery to automatically make them. That same year, he took out a patent on a tailpiece that allowed musicians to restring their instruments faster. In 1905, while still living in Hartford, Bacon applied for a patent for a new type of resonator for open-backed banjos. He was awarded the patent in June 1906, after he sold his Hartford house in April.

Builders finished working on their house and barn in Forest Dale (part of Brandon), Vermont in 1907. He moved into the home with his wife by 1907, calling it Stonehurst.

In 1908 they bought a second, large place as an investment, that they intended to turn into a hotel.  They began touring together as an act about 1910,  having  two Vermont homes for summer and winter.

Bacon advertised his banjos in the July 1909 issue of Cadenza magazine, as the "Bacon Mfg. and Pub. Co"  of Forestdale, Vermont.

Although Bacon was contracting with Vega to make his early banjos, photos in a magazine article show that Bacon had a luthiery set up in Forest Dale, ca. 1910. Bacon may have been selling his banjos from there, also about 1910. By 1913, "the F. J. Bacon Banjo company" or "Bacon Manufacturing Company" was hiring and had a printed catalog of banjos. They incorporated their company in 1920 as the "Bacon Banjo Company" of Groton, Connecticut.

The demands for the five-string banjo declined in the 1920s, replaced by the tenor banjo.  Bacon brought in David L. Day as vice president of the company, and the banjos that were made under Day reached the top of the market. The high-end banjos that the Bacon Banjo Company made during the Jazz Age were highly decorated with gold plating, engraving  ebony, ivory. They were made to sparkle in the hands of entertainers on stage. Their top end model cost $1000, when a worker’s yearly wager might be $300.

Compositions

American Beauty
The Merry Snowshoers
c. 1901, Commandery March
1910, Arcadia (polka brilliante)
1910, The Dragon Fly (dance characteristic)
1910, The Enchantress (valse brilliante)
c. 1910, Happy Thoughts (schottische)
1910, La Serenata (serenade)
1910, Little Sunbeam (waltz)
1910, Pavilion (schottische)
1910, Pit Pat (schottische)
1910, Sweethearts (romanza)
1910, The Round Up (galop di concert)
1910, The Troopers
1910, The Trumpeter (march)−

1910, Twilight Reverie
1911 Dance — Magnetic
1911, The Fascinator (waltz brilliant)
1911, 1925, March — The Conqueror
1911, 1921, On the Range (galop)
1911, The Turkey Gobbler Rag
1911, Wildwood Memories
1912, West Lawn Polka
1915, Dance Oriental
1915, The Dawn of Love
1915, Sleep little one sleep (cradle song)
1918, Clear the Way, music for
1918, Nourmaleen, music for
1918, Peace, The New Dawn, music for
1919, In Spoonland It’s Happy All The Time, music for
1921, The Canadian Mounted (march)

1921, The Coquette (schottische)
1921, Dance of the Fairies
1921, Dance of the Scarecrows
1921, Dancing Sunbeams
1921, The Debutante (schottische caprice)
1921, Loves Secret
1921, March of the Marines
1921, On the Trail, march
1921, Pretty Brown Eyes
1921, The Princess (polka di concert)
1921, Waltz Impromptu
1921, Tarantella
1921, The Winnipeg Rag
c. 1922, Crazy Quilt Rag
1922, A Study in Black Rag

1925, Naval Cadets March
c. 1926, Silver Bell March
c. 1927, Ghost Dance
c. 1927, Spirit Dance, Indian lament
c. 1928, Chinese Serenade
c. 1928, Dancing Moonbeams
c. 1928, The Dawn of Love (waltz)
c. 1928, Hopi Indian Snake Dance
c. 1928, Mia Rita (Mexican Serenade)
c. 1928, Satan's return

Arrangements and variations

Moskowski Valse (Moritz Moszkowski)
Pride of Fifth Avenue (march)
1897, Alice, Where Art Thou? (romance) (J. Ascher)
c. 1901, Kaka Kaka Dance
c. 1901, Medley, Old Songs
c. 1901, Medley, Popular Songs
c. 1902, Medley, Popular Airs
c. 1902, Chinese Picnic, (John St. George) descriptive
c. 1902, Grand Operatic Potpourri
selections from:
Il Trovatore or To Arms (march)
Carmen
Poet and Peasant (Suppe)
William Tell
c. 1905 The Nightingale and the Frogs (Richard Eilenberg)
c. 1905 Grand Polka de Concert (Homer Newton Bartlett)
c. 1905 Valse Brilliante or Grand Valse de Concert (Wieniawski op.3)

c. 1908, National Airs, grand fantasia
c. 1908, Grand Valse Brilliante 
c. 1909, Polkadi Concert
c. 1909, Medley of Familiar Airs
c. 1909, Say Not Farewell
1910, At a Husking Bee, reels and hornpipes
Irish Washerwoman
Fisher's Hornpipe
Old Zip Coon
The Campbells Are Coming
Arkansas Traveler
c. 1910, Familiar Scotch Airs
1911, Famous Reels and Hornpipes, banjo
Liverpool Hornpipe
Four Hand Reel
Rickett's Hornpipe

1911, Kinloch of Kinloch (fantasia for banjo), Scottish air, variations
1911, 1921, Old Black Joe, 2 variations
1911, Old Folks at Home (Stephen Foster, Berthold)
1911, La Paloma
c. 1911, The Round Up
c. 1911, Selections from Faust (Gounod)
c. 1911, Selections from Famous Overtures
c. 1911, Songs of Long Ago, variations
1921, Sextet from "Lucia" (Gaetano Donizetti)
c. 1933, Sounds from the Cotton Fields

Published works

Folios
1906, Siegel-Myers Correspondence School of Music ... Chicago. Banjo Lesson No. 1(-4). Composed and edited by F. J. Bacon. Chicago : Siegel-Myers Correspondence School of Music, 1906.
1910, Compositions and Arrangements for Banjo with Piano accompaniment, by F. J. Bacon. Chicago: Siegel-Myers School of Music, (1910).
includes: Arcadia (polka brilliante); La Serenata (serenade); Little Sunbeam (waltz); Pavilion (schottische); Pit Pat (schottische); Sweethearts (romanza); The Dragon Fly (dance characteristic); the Enchantress (valse brilliante); The Round Up (galop di concert); The Trumpeter (march).
Alternatively called 10 Original Compositions for Banjo and Piano
c. 1928, Bacon melody folio : 5 choice solos
 contains Hopi Indian Snake Dance, Chinese Serenade, Dancing Moonbeams, Mia Rita (Mexican Serenade), The Dawn of Love (Waltz).

Methods
1911, New and revised method for the banjo, Bacon-Goggin Publishing Company, Schenectady, N.Y. This book teaches the banjo in A notation.
1915, Lesson (A) in Tremolo
1915, Tremolo Lesson Number 2
1921 Paramount Method for Banjo in C Notation, William J. Smith Music Company, New York
1924 The Improved paramount Method for the Banjo : in C notation, finger style, William J. Smith Music Company, New York

Recordings

Victor
1912, March 22 The enchantress, Victor, B-11780, F. J. Bacon, Banjo solo, unaccompanied
1912, March 22 Massa's in de cold, cold ground, Victor, B-11782, F. J. Bacon, Banjo solo, unaccompanied
1912, March 22 Old folks at home, Victor, B-11783, F. J. Bacon, Banjo solo, unaccompanied
1912, April 15 The troopers march, Victor, B-11877, F. J. Bacon, banjo solo, accompanied by Fred Bachman (piano)
1912 April 15 West lawn polka, Victor, Victor 17129, Matrix/Take: B-11781/4, Fred J. Bacon, banjo solo, accompanied by Fred Bachman

Edison
1915, December 11 Massa's in de cold, cold ground, Edison Blue Amberol: 2853 / Edison Record: 4330, Fred J. Bacon, banjo solo, unaccompanied
1916, February 5, Old Black Joe, Edison matrix 4475,	Edison 50351, Fred J. Bacon, banjo solo, unaccompanied
1917 Medley of Scotch airs, Edison Blue Amberol: 3109 / Edison Record: 5110, Fred J. Bacon, banjo solo, unaccompanied
1917Medley of southern airs, Edison Blue Amberol: 3122 /Edison Record: 5109, Fred J. Bacon, banjo solo, unaccompanied. Includes My old Kentucky home, Dixie, Old folks at home.

Bacon Banjo Company
1926 Massa's in the cold, cold ground, Bacon Banjo Company, promotional record, Fred J. Bacon, banjo solo, unaccompanied

Gallery

Classic banjos

Jazz Age banjos

References

External links
List of Bacon's U. S. patents
Page at Mugwumps that considers different eras of Bacon banjos.
News clipping detailing songlist at Bacon concert
Bacon history from the point of view of ukulele-banjo or banjolele.
Page that has photo of Frederick J Bacon with his expensive B&D five string banjo,  decorated ib the same way as his tenor banjos.
Page with photo from 1901 of Frederick J Bacon with one of his B&D tenor banjos.
The physics PHa Bacon and Day banjo resonating chamber
conversations about B&D banjos

American banjoists
Musical instrument manufacturing companies of the United States
American male composers
American music arrangers
American performance artists
1871 births
1948 deaths
19th-century American composers
20th-century American composers
Victor Records artists
Edison Records artists
20th-century American male musicians
Musicians from Connecticut
Musicians from Vermont
19th-century American male musicians